The 1934 United States Senate election in Missouri was held on November 6, 1934. Incumbent Republican U.S. Senator Roscoe Patterson, first elected in 1928, sought reelection to a second term. He was defeated by the Democratic candidate, future Vice President and President of the United States Harry Truman.

Democratic primary

Candidates
James Longstreet Cleveland
John J. Cochran, U.S. Representative from St. Louis 
Jacob L. Milligan, U.S. Representative from Richmond
Harry S. Truman, presiding judge of the Jackson County Court

Campaign
Harry Truman, having served as a judge, expressed an interest in running for the U.S. House of Representatives in 1934, but political boss Tom Pendergast had already selected another candidate for that race. After four other potential candidates had declined to run, Pendergast ultimately approached Truman to discuss a possible run for the United States Senate, to Truman's surprise. Truman, with backing from Pendergast, entered the Senate race. Truman said he would not, if elected, dictate to anyone, to the dismay of anti-Pendergast U.S. Senator Bennett Champ Clark.

Truman waged a statewide campaign and eventually won the largely three-way Democratic primary on August 7, 1934, by a significant margin, defeating U.S. Representatives John Cochran and Jacob Milligan.

Results

Nearly half of Truman's vote (137,529) came from Jackson County alone, where he received 92.8%. Likewise, Cochran received over half of his overall vote (121,048) from St. Louis and St. Louis County, where he led with 90.5% and 77.9%, respectively.

General election

Results

See also
1934 United States Senate elections
List of United States senators from Missouri

References

1934
Missouri
United States Senate
Harry S. Truman